Charles W. Ingraham (April 8, 1860 – February 18, 1906) was a catcher in Major League Baseball for the 1883 Baltimore Orioles of the American Association. He appeared in one game for the Orioles on July 4, 1883 and recorded one hit in four at bats.

Sources

1860 births
1906 deaths
19th-century baseball players
Major League Baseball catchers
Baltimore Orioles (AA) players
Burials at Rosehill Cemetery
Youngstown (minor league baseball) players
Trenton Trentonians players
Winona Clippers players
Lancaster Ironsides players
Oshkosh (minor league baseball) players
Eau Claire (minor league baseball) players
Duluth Freezers players
LaCrosse Freezers players
Dubuque (minor league baseball) players
Chicago Maroons players
Baseball players from Ohio